Korwin-Szymanowski is a surname. Notable people with the surname include:

 Korwin-Szymanowski family, name of ancient heritage in Greater Poland
 Theodore de Korwin Szymanowski (1846–1901), Polish nobleman and landowner

Compound surnames
Polish-language surnames